Elections to the National Baseball Hall of Fame and Museum for  followed the system in place since 1978. 
The Baseball Writers' Association of America (BBWAA) voted by mail to select from recent major league players and 
elected two, Catfish Hunter and Billy Williams. The Veterans Committee met in closed sessions to consider older major league players as well as managers, umpires, executives, and figures from the Negro leagues. It selected Ray Dandridge from the Negro leagues. A formal induction ceremony was held in Cooperstown, New York, on July 26, 1987, with Commissioner of Baseball Peter Ueberroth in attendance.

BBWAA election 
The BBWAA was authorized to elect players active in 1967 or later, but not after 1981; the ballot included candidates from the 1986 ballot who received at least 5% of the vote but were not elected, along with selected players, chosen by a screening committee, whose last appearance was in 1981. All 10-year members of the BBWAA were eligible to vote.

Voters were instructed to cast votes for up to 10 candidates; any candidate receiving votes on at least 75% of the ballots would be honored with induction to the Hall. The ballot consisted of 28 players; a total of 413 ballots were cast, with 310 votes required for election. A total of 2,730 individual votes were cast, an average of 6.61 per ballot—a record low up to this point, breaking the record low of 6.81 set in 1962. Those candidates receiving less than 5% of the vote will not appear on future BBWAA ballots, but may eventually be considered by the Veterans Committee.

Candidates who were eligible for the first time are indicated here with a dagger (†). The two candidates who received at least 75% of the vote and was elected is indicated in bold italics; candidates who have since been elected in subsequent elections are indicated in italics. The 4 candidates who received less than 5% of the vote, thus becoming ineligible for future BBWAA consideration, are indicated with an asterisk (*).

Lew Burdette was on the ballot for the 15th and final time.

The newly eligible players included 8 All-Stars, three of whom were not included on the ballot, representing a total of 17 All-Star selections. 4-time All Star Sal Bando had the most selections of any newly eligible candidate. The field included two Cy Young Award winners (Mike Marshall and Steve Stone, who retired one season after winning his award).

Players eligible for the first time who were not included on the ballot were: Rick Auerbach, Ken Brett, Reggie Cleveland, Dick Drago, Duffy Dyer, John Ellis, Tom Hutton, Pat Kelly, Mike Lum, Billy North, Johnny Oates, Freddie Patek, Dave Roberts, Rennie Stennett, Mike Tyson and John Vukovich.

J. G. Taylor Spink Award 
Jack Lang (1921–2007) received the J. G. Taylor Spink Award honoring a baseball writer. The award was voted at the December 1986 meeting of the BBWAA, and included in the summer 1987 ceremonies.

References

External links 
1987 Election at www.baseballhalloffame.org.

Baseball Hall of Fame balloting
Hall of Fame balloting